Ban Chang is a town (Thesaban Mueang) located in the Ban Chang District (Amphoe) of Rayong Province of Eastern Thailand. In 2019, it had a total population of 30,983 people.

References

Populated places in Rayong province